Kent Berger Carlson (born January 11, 1962 in Concord, New Hampshire) is a retired American ice hockey defenseman.

Drafted in 1982 by the Montreal Canadiens, Carlson, also played for the St. Louis Blues, and Washington Capitals. In 2005, Carlson participated in the Hockey Enforcers (hockey fighting) event that was shown on pay-per-view from Prince George, B.C., Canada.

Career statistics

Awards and honors

References

External links

Profile at hockeydaftcentral.com

1962 births
American men's ice hockey defensemen
Baltimore Skipjacks players
Living people
Montreal Canadiens draft picks
Montreal Canadiens players
Peoria Rivermen (IHL) players
Sherbrooke Canadiens players
St. Lawrence Saints men's ice hockey players
St. Louis Blues players
Washington Capitals players
Sportspeople from Concord, New Hampshire
Ice hockey people from New Hampshire